Prosoplus decussatus is a species of beetle in the family Cerambycidae. It was described by Stephan von Breuning in 1957. It is endemic to New Guinea.

References

Prosoplus
Beetles described in 1957
Endemic fauna of New Guinea